Naval History is a bi-monthly magazine published by the United States Naval Institute since 1987. The 72-page publication includes feature articles spanning the course of naval history written by significant scholars of their subject but also has standing features, including "Looking Back," "On Our Scope," "Naval History News," "Book Reviews," and "Museum Report."

The noted authors Norman Polmar and A.D. Baker III provide the "Historic Aircraft" and "Historic Fleets" columns.

Each issue is illustrated with rare art and photographs of noteworthy people and events.

External links
 Official site

1987 establishments in Maryland
Bimonthly magazines published in the United States
History magazines published in the United States
Magazines established in 1987
Magazines published in Maryland
Maritime history magazines
Military magazines published in the United States
Magazine
Naval Postgraduate School
United States Naval Institute